"Goodbye, You Suck" is the second single by Canadian pop/rock singer Shiloh. The song is about ignorance, greed, and lying in a relationship. It made the Canadian Hot 100 for one week at number 73. A music video for the single, directed by Aaron A, features Shiloh performing with her band and some dancers as the Shiloh logo is scattered around the set.

Critical reception
Jason Birchmeier of AllMusic compared the song to the previous single "Operator (A Girl Like Me)", calling it "similarly impressive, once again skipping along during the verse before the synth-powered chorus kicks in."

Music video
The music video was released in February 2009. Directed by Aaron A (who previously directed the video for "Operator (A Girl Like Me)", the video features Shiloh with her band and some dancers with the Shiloh logo scattered around the set. She performs the song as she would on stage. Before the last chorus the lights turn on and off very quickly.

The video gave Shiloh a nomination for UR FAVE New Artist of the Year at the 2009 MuchMusic Video Awards but lost to The Midway State's "Never Again".

Credits and personnel
Credits adapted from the liner notes of Picture Imperfect.

Recording
 Chris Anderson: engineer, production (Definitive Sound Studio)

Personnel
 Dan Kanter: guitar
 Rob Wells: other instruments

Charts

References

2008 songs
2009 singles
Shiloh (singer) songs
Universal Music Group singles
Music videos directed by Aaron A
Songs written by Rob Wells